No Interference is an album by Dysrhythmia.  It was rereleased in 2005 on Translation Loss Records with live bonus tracks.

Track listing

References
Dysrhythmia's official website

Discogs

Dysrhythmia (band) albums
2001 albums
Self-released albums